, born June 1, 1979, in Osaka Prefecture, known as "Namie-han" to her fans, is a Japanese gag manga artist. Her works have been featured in Shueisha's magazine Weekly Shōnen Jump and, more recently, its sister publications Business Jump, Ultra Jump and Young Jump.

Odama says she "became a manga artist because [she] can't do anything else". She debuted in the autumn of 1995 after winning an honorable mention for the Shikishō Prize given out by Kodansha's manga magazine Afternoon. She also was the runner-up for the Akatsuka Award in 2000 for her manga Junjō Pine.

Works (in chronological order)

Series
2000-2001 
2002 
2003 
2004 
2006 
2007- 
2009-

Short stories
2008

Short story collections
2005

Sources

Living people
Year of birth missing (living people)